Lycurgus is a rural unincorporated community in Allamakee County, Iowa, United States.

History

The first settler in the Lycurgus area was a Mexican War veteran in 1851. In the 1860s, a hotel and store were located in the area.

The first post office in Lycurgus was established circa 1852.  It was moved to a hotel/store in 1868.   A school was built, of native stone, in 1868.  The school operated until consolidation took place in the 1960s.  

The area also has long had a Catholic church, dating back to approximately 1860.(7 November 1929). Death Called Father J. Whalen, Decorah Public Opinion The church grounds also included a rectory, cemetery, and parish hall. In 2006, the church was closed and made an oratory.

Gradually, the Lycurgus area emptied. Lycurgus' population, in 1902, was just 12; in 1925, the population was 52.

References

Unincorporated communities in Allamakee County, Iowa
Unincorporated communities in Iowa
1852 establishments in Iowa
Populated places established in 1852